Ernest Harvey Kelly (17 November 1884 – 22 May 1939) was an Australian rules footballer who played for  and  in the Western Australian Football Association (WAFA) and Carlton in the Victorian Football League (VFL).

Career
Although he was from Melbourne, Kelly started his career in Western Australia. He was East Fremantle's leading goal-kicker in 1904 and was also a member of their premiership team that year, alongside his elder brothers Harvey and Otto Kelly. The three brothers all crossed to South Fremantle and played together in 1905 and 1906. Harvey Kelly returned to Victoria in 1907 and after Ernie played another season for South Fremantle, he joined his brother at Carlton in 1908.

Carlton had been premiers the previous two seasons so Kelly could only break into the seniors on eight occasions. On his league debut, against Melbourne, he kicked three goals.

References

External links

1884 births
1939 deaths
Place of death missing
Australian rules footballers from Melbourne
Australian Rules footballers: place kick exponents
East Fremantle Football Club players
South Fremantle Football Club players
Carlton Football Club players
People from Port Melbourne